Pocahontas County is a county located in Iowa, United States. As of the 2020 census the population was 7,078, making it the state's ninth-least populous county. The county seat is Pocahontas. The county was formed in 1851.

The county is named in honor of Pocahontas, the famous Native American woman from Jamestown, Virginia. A colossal statue of her stands in the city of Pocahontas.

Geography

Major highways
 Iowa Highway 3
 Iowa Highway 4
 Iowa Highway 7
 Iowa Highway 10
 Iowa Highway 15

Adjacent counties
Palo Alto County  (north)
Humboldt County  (east)
Webster County  (southeast)
Calhoun County  (south)
Buena Vista County  (west)

Demographics

2020 census
There were 3,666 housing units, of which 3,090 were occupied.

2010 census
There were 3,794 housing units, of which 3,233 were occupied.

2000 census

As of the census of 2000, there were 8,662 people, 3,617 households, and 2,430 families residing in the county.  The population density was 15 people per square mile (6/km2).  There were 3,988 housing units at an average density of 7 per square mile (3/km2).  The racial makeup of the county was 98.49% White, 0.24% Black or African American, 0.17% Native American, 0.17% Asian, 0.01% Pacific Islander, 0.30% from other races, and 0.61% from two or more races.  0.89% of the population were Hispanic or Latino of any race.

There were 3,617 households, out of which 29.50% had children under the age of 18 living with them, 58.30% were married couples living together, 5.90% had a female householder with no husband present, and 32.80% were non-families. 30.20% of all households were made up of individuals, and 17.80% had someone living alone who was 65 years of age or older.  The average household size was 2.35 and the average family size was 2.91.

In the county, the population was spread out, with 25.40% under the age of 18, 5.30% from 18 to 24, 23.40% from 25 to 44, 24.10% from 45 to 64, and 21.70% who were 65 years of age or older.  The median age was 42 years. For every 100 females there were 96.60 males.  For every 100 females age 18 and over, there were 93.20 males.

The median income for a household in the county was $33,362, and the median income for a family was $40,568. Males had a median income of $27,929 versus $20,515 for females. The per capita income for the county was $17,006.  About 6.60% of families and 9.10% of the population were below the poverty line, including 12.30% of those under age 18 and 6.50% of those age 65 or over.

Communities

Cities

Fonda
Gilmore City
Havelock
Laurens
Palmer
Plover
Pocahontas
Rolfe
Varina

Unincorporated communities
Ware

Townships

Bellville
Cedar
Center
Colfax
Cummins
Des Moines
Dover
Garfield
Grant
Lake
Lincoln
Lizard
Marshall
Powhatan
Roosevelt
Sherman
Swan Lake

Population ranking
The population ranking of the following table is based on the 2020 census of Pocahontas County.

† county seat

Politics

See also

Pocahontas County Courthouse
National Register of Historic Places listings in Pocahontas County, Iowa
Manson crater

References

External links

Pocahontas County Economic Development Commission
 
 The Pioneer History of Pocahontas County, Iowa (1902), a county history by Robert E. Flickinger

 
Iowa placenames of Native American origin
1851 establishments in Iowa
Populated places established in 1851